Leonard Ware (December 28, 1909 – March 30, 1974) was one of the first jazz guitarists to play electric guitar.

Career
Ware was born in Richmond, Virginia. He went to college at the Tuskegee Institute and learned how to play the oboe.

In 1938, Ware played electric guitar on recordings by Sidney Bechet. The duo he then started with Jimmy Shirley was one of the first groups to have two electric guitarists. Ware performed in a trio during the 1940s and recorded as a leader in 1947. He also recorded with Don Byas, Albinia Jones, Buddy Johnson, and Big Joe Turner.

In December 1938, he played at Carnegie Hall with the Kansas City Six (Lester Young and Buck Clayton); in 1939 he recorded with Benny Goodman ("Umbrella Man").

Ware was the co-composer of "Hold Tight" (which he recorded with Bechet) and "I Dreamt I Dwelt in Harlem" (with Jerry Gray and Buddy Feyne), which was recorded by Glenn Miller and The Delta Rhythm Boys in 1941. A few years later, he dropped out of music. He died in 1974.

Discography
 1937–1938, Sidney Bechet (Classics)

References

Sources
 Bielefelder Katalog 1988
 Richard Cook & Brian Morton: The Penguin Guide to Jazz on CD 6th edition. 
 Leonard Feather, Ira Gitler: The Biographical Encyclopedia of Jazz. Oxford University Press, Oxford usw. 1999; 
 John Jörgensen, Erik Wiedemann Jazzlexikon. Mosaik, München, 1967

1909 births
1974 deaths
Musicians from Richmond, Virginia
African-American jazz guitarists
American jazz composers
American male jazz composers
American jazz guitarists
20th-century American guitarists
Jazz musicians from Virginia
American male guitarists
20th-century American male musicians
20th-century jazz composers
20th-century African-American musicians